Bowery to Bagdad is a 1955 comedy film starring The Bowery Boys. The film was released on January 2, 1955, by Allied Artists and is the thirty-sixth film in the series.

Plot
Sach buys a magic lamp containing a Genie.  A group of gangsters see the boys using the lamp and steal it.  However, the boys had made a wish that only the Slip and Sach could request wishes from the Genie so he is unable to grant the gangsters wishes.  The gangsters decide that if the two of them were dead then the Genie would have no choice but to obey their commands.  The Genie has taken a liking to the boys and helps them escape, but they are transported back to Baghdad where the true master of the lamp resides, leaving Slip and Sach without any more wishes.  The Genie, feeling sorry for them, grants them one more wish, which Sach uses to "wish I had the nerve to sock him (Slip) in the chin", which the Genie grants.

Cast

The Bowery Boys
 Leo Gorcey as Terrance Aloysius 'Slip' Mahoney
 Huntz Hall as Horace Debussy 'Sach' Jones
 David Gorcey as Chuck Anderson (Credited as David Condon)
 Bennie Bartlett as Butch Williams

Remaining cast
 Bernard Gorcey as Louie Dumbrowski
 Joan Shawlee as Velma (a/k/a Cindy Lou Calhoun)
 Eric Blore as the Genie

International release
This film was released in England in October 1954.

Home media
Warner Archives released the film on made-to-order DVD in the United States as part of "The Bowery Boys, Volume Four" on August 26, 2014.

See also
 List of American films of 1955

References

External links
 
 
 
 

1955 comedy films
1955 films
American black-and-white films
American comedy films
Bowery Boys films
Films set in Baghdad
Genies in film
Allied Artists films
1950s English-language films
Films directed by Edward Bernds
1950s American films